Domesticated is the seventh studio album by French musician Sébastien Tellier. It was released on 29 May 2020 under Record Makers.

The album was originally scheduled for release at the end of April 2020, but got pushed back to 29 May 2020 due to COVID-19.

Critical reception
Domesticated was met with generally favorable reviews from critics. At Metacritic, which assigns a weighted average rating out of 100 to reviews from mainstream publications, this release received an average score of 65, based on 6 reviews.

Track listing
Adapted from Qobuz and Apple Music.

All tracks written and composed by Sébastien Tellier.

Notes
  signifies an additional producer

Personnel
Credits for Domesticated adapted from booklet.

 Sébastien Tellier – primary artist, vocals (all), composer (all)
 Nk.F – mastering (all)
 Corentin "nit" Kerdraon – producer (2-3, 5, 7), additional producer (1, 4, 8), guitar (7), strings (6)
 Varnish La Piscine – producer (3, 7), additional vocals (3)
 Jam City – producer (1, 8)
 Mind Gamers – producer (4, 6)
 Daniel Stricker – drums (2, 5)
 Philippe Zdar – producer (3)

Charts

References

2020 albums
Sébastien Tellier albums